Willie Spencer Myrick, known as W. Spencer Myrick (November 23, 1918 – November 24, 1991), was a conservative Democratic member of both houses of the Louisiana State Legislature for West Carroll Parish in northeastern Louisiana.

Background
Myrick was one of ten children born in Simpson County in south central Mississippi, to tenant farmers James Martin "Jim" Myrick and his wife, the former Allie Artimissa Parker. Prior to the Great Depression, the family relocated to West Carroll Parish, where they purchased a  farm near Oak Grove. Myrick dropped out of school in the third grade to help his parents to work the farm. One of his  brothers was Billie E. "Bill" Myrick, a country music figure from Odessa, Texas.

Political life

Myrick first entered state politics as an elected member of the House of Representatives, having served from 1956 to 1960 during the final administration of Governor Earl Kemp Long. During the following second administration of Governor Jimmie Davis, Myrick was an investigator for the Louisiana Sovereignty Commission, which monitored  civil rights activists and communist infiltrators within the state. The panel was headed by Frank Voelker, Jr., a Tulane University Law School graduate and the former city attorney in his native Lake Providence in East Carroll Parish, located due east of Myrick's own West Carroll Parish. Voelker ran in the 1963 Democratic gubernatorial primary but polled few votes. In that same election, Myrick was nominated and then elected without opposition to the Louisiana State Senate. He served a single term from 1964 to 1968.

Myrick did not seek reelection to the Senate in 1967. Instead, he ran unsuccessfully statewide for Louisiana insurance commissioner against the one-term incumbent Dudley A. Guglielmo. Myrick also worked periodically as an aide to Governor Earl Long, a confidant and friend.

After his legislative years, Myrick and his wife, the former Marie Gammill (May 13, 1918–June 19, 1998) resided in Baton Rouge, where Myrick died.

See also

References

Further reading
Michael L. Kurtz and Morgan D. Peoples, Earl K. Long: The Saga of Uncle Earl and Louisiana Politics. Louisiana State University Press, 1992.

1918 births
1991 deaths
People from Simpson County, Mississippi
Baptists from Mississippi
People from Oak Grove, Louisiana
Politicians from Baton Rouge, Louisiana
Democratic Party Louisiana state senators
Democratic Party members of the Louisiana House of Representatives
Farmers from Louisiana
20th-century American businesspeople
20th-century American politicians
Baptists from Louisiana
20th-century Baptists
American anti-communists